Oak Park, California may refer to:

 Oak Park, Sacramento, California, a neighborhood in Sacramento southeast of Downtown
 Oak Park, California (Ventura County), a census-designated place in Ventura County, California